Ramathibodi Hospital is a university hospital of the Faculty of Medicine Ramathibodi Hospital,  Mahidol University. and is a hospital capable of super tertiary care. It is a teaching hospital for all undergraduate students of the Faculty of Medicine Ramathibodi Hospital.

History 
Following the Second National Economic and Social Development Plan (1964–1966), medical demands rose rapidly and the Thai government sought to increase the number of doctors and nurses in the country. In August 1964, the government cabinet approved the plan of setting up a new medical school which would be located around the Phaya Thai area, on the Thung Phaya Thai grounds owned by the Treasury Department and located opposite the Ministry of Industry. Furthermore, a new hospital called was also to be built on the site. On December 30, 1965, HM King Bhumibol Adulyadej graciously conferred upon the name of this new medical school "Ramathibodi" and laid the foundation stone for the faculty and hospital's buildings, as well as officially enrolling the first cohort of medical students at the Faculty of Science. Construction was started and the hospital opened on May 3, 1969 at the same time as the faculty. The hospital is generally regarded as one of the final referral centers for complicated and rare diseases from all hospitals in Thailand.

The Faculty of Medicine Ramathibodi Hospital, Mahidol University is one of the two medical schools within Mahidol University. The older sister is the Faculty of Medicine Siriraj Hospital, Mahidol University. The Logo of the Ramathibodi Hospital is the shape of ร, the first thai alphabet of the Thai name of 'Ramathibodi (รามาธิบดี)'.

Facilities 
The hospital is located on Rama 6 Road, close to Chitralada Royal Villa. There are 3 main health servicing buildings (Building 1, Queen Sirikit Building, and Somdet Phra Debaratana Building) on the medical school campus which serve at least 5,000 out-patient visits per day and in-patients with more than 1,300 beds for tertiary medical care It is served by Ramathibodi Hospital Railway Halt, operated by the State Railway of Thailand.

The Faculty of Medicine Ramathibodi Hospital has three principal buildings to serve more than 5,000 out-patients per day. The main building, Building 1, provides more than 1,000 beds for the tertiary care of complicated and severely ill patients in various specializing departments and units. The second building, Queen Sirikit Building, hosts many medical centers for specialised treatment such as:
 Advanced Diagnostic Imaging and Imaging-guided Minimal Invasive Therapy Center (AIMC)
 Cardiovascular and Metabolic Center (CVMC)
 Queen Sirikit Medical Center (QSMC), serving as a center for advanced projects, e.g., bone marrow transplantation project
It also houses modern operating rooms and intensive care units.

The third building is located at the intersection corner of Ratchathewi Road and Rama 6 Road - the Somdech Phra Debaratana Building. It was opened by Princess Sirindhorn on August 14, 2011 and is the largest and newest building. The building is separated from the main hospital grounds as the National Cancer Center (NCI) operated by the Ministry of Public Health, is located between the buildings. It houses Somdech Phra Debaratana Medical Center (SDMC), which has 350 beds, 16 operating rooms, 14 Intensive Care Units, and specialized services, such as:

 Stem Cell Transplantation Center
 Minimal Invasive Endoscopic Surgery Center
 Elderly Care Unit Center
 Child Development Center
 Complicated Diseases Services
There is a shrine to Prince Abhakara Kiartivongse, Prince of Chumphon, located in the grounds.

See also
Health in Thailand
Healthcare in Thailand
 Hospitals in Thailand
 List of hospitals in Thailand
 List of hospitals in Bangkok
 Samut Prakan radiation accident

References

External links

Hospital buildings completed in 1969
Hospitals in Bangkok
Hospitals established in 1969
1969 establishments in Thailand
Mahidol University
Teaching hospitals in Thailand
Hospitals in Thailand